Spic (also spelled spick) is an ethnic slur used in the United States for people from Latin American countries and states.

Etymology
Some sources from the United States believe that the word spic is a play on a Spanish-accented pronunciation of the English word speak. The Oxford English Dictionary takes spic to be a contraction of the earlier form spiggoty. The oldest known use of spiggoty is in 1910 by Wilbur Lawton in Boy Aviators in Nicaragua, or, In League with the Insurgents. Stuart Berg Flexner, in I Hear America Talking (1976), favored the explanation that it derives from "no spik Ingles" (or "no spika de Ingles"). 

However, in an earlier publication, the 1960 Dictionary of American Slang, written by Dr. Harold Wentworth, with Flexner as second author, spic is first identified as a noun for an Italian or "American of Italian ancestry", along with the words 'spic, spig, and spiggoty, and confirms that it is shortened from the word spaghetti. The authors refer to the word's usage in James M. Cain's Mildred Pierce, referring to a "wop or spig", and note that this term was never preferred over wop, and has been rarely used since 1915. However, the etymology remains.

See also
 Anti-Hispanic racism in the United States
 Spic and Span

References

External links

Ethnic and religious slurs
Hispanic and Latino American
Italian-American history
Hispanophobia
English profanity